Takzeh may refer to:
 Takzeh, Sirjan
 Takzeh, Pariz